Kondwani Mtonga (born 12 February 1986) is a Zambian professional footballer who plays for ZESCO United F.C. in the Zambian Premier League.

Career

NorthEast United (loan) 
In 2014 he was Loaned to NorthEast United from ZESCO United F.C. for 2014 Indian Super League season. In this season scored 2 goals in 14 appearances.

He stayed another year with NorthEast United.Mtonga was ruled out for the entirety of the 2015 Indian Super League season after suffering a medial meniscus injury during pre-season.

International
Mtonga started his career with Zamtel Ndola in 2007 before joining Zesco United in 2008. In 2013, Mtonga was targeted as a signing by French Ligue 1 club Sochaux. However, nothing came of the deal.

International
Mtonga has played internationally for Zambia since 2009.

Honours
ZESCO United
Zambian Premier League: 2008, 2010, 2014

References

External links

1984 births
Living people
Sportspeople from Lusaka
Zambian footballers
Association football midfielders
Zambia international footballers
2015 Africa Cup of Nations players
ZESCO United F.C. players
NorthEast United FC players
Shillong Lajong FC players
Indian Super League players
Zambia A' international footballers
2018 African Nations Championship players
Zambian expatriate footballers
Expatriate footballers in India
Zambian expatriate sportspeople in India